Broadway District is a neighborhood in Seattle, Washington. The city's Department of Neighborhoods places Broadway on the southwest side of Capitol Hill.

References

Capitol Hill, Seattle